Francis George Cumming (18 November 1861 – 18 October 1941) was a New Zealand salvation army officer, chaplain, social worker and probation officer. He was born in Marnoch, Banffshire, Scotland on 18 November 1861.

References

1861 births
1941 deaths
New Zealand social workers
Scottish emigrants to New Zealand
New Zealand Salvationists